Gordon Avil (3 March 1899 – 25 April 1970) was an American cinematographer. He worked in Billy the Kid (1930), The Champ (1931), A Miracle Can Happen (1948), Robot Monster (1953), Shield for Murder (1954), King Dinosaur (1955), Big House, U.S.A. (1955), The Black Sleep (1956) and The Underwater City (1962). According to Robert Clary, he was one of the most patient and endearing people he ever met. He died in April 1970 of a heart attack while shooting the TV series Hogan's Heroes.

References

Bibliography

External links
 

1899 births
1970 deaths
American cinematographers